Grand Canyon Airlines is a 14 CFR Part 135 air carrier headquartered on the grounds of Boulder City Municipal Airport in Boulder City, Nevada, United States. It also has bases at Grand Canyon National Park Airport and Page Municipal Airport, both in Arizona. It operates sightseeing tours and charter service over and around the Grand Canyon. Its headquarters and main operation center is Grand Canyon National Park Airport and Boulder City Municipal Airport.  The company slogan is With Grand Canyon Airlines, Your Memories are Cleared for Takeoff!

The airline is owned by Elling Halvorson and had 600 employees as of October 2019. Grand Canyon Airlines introduced commercial airline service to Boulder City Airport (predecessor to the contemporary airport) on June 15, 1936.

History
The airline was started in 1927 as Scenic Airways by J. Parker Van Zandt at Grand Canyon, Arizona with a Stinson SM-1 Detroiter and Ford Trimotor aircraft. On February 23, 1929, the opening day of the Arizona Biltmore Hotel, Scenic Airways dropped a wooden key on the roof of the hotel's ballroom. The key is on display above the fireplace of the Biltmore History Room.

Scenic Airways changed its name to Grand Canyon Airlines in 1930, and Grand Canyon Airlines is believed to be the world's oldest air tour company in continuous operations.

Two Grand Canyon Airlines pilots were the first to spot the wreckage left by the 1956 Grand Canyon mid-air collision, between United and TWA aircraft. Pilots Henry and Palin Hudgen had been flying a scheduled service around the area at the time.

On March 29, 2007, Scenic Airlines was sold to Grand Canyon Airlines and was subsequently renamed Grand Canyon Scenic Airlines. The airline continued to operate from the Boulder City airport providing services to Grand Canyon West, Grand Canyon, Page, Arizona, Monument Valley, Utah, and Rainbow Bridge, Utah. At that time, Grand Canyon Scenic Airlines continued to operate sightseeing flight services to the Grand Canyon every day of the year.

On March 19, 2009 Grand Canyon Airlines moved its operations at the Boulder City airport into the company's new Boulder City Aerocenter, a  terminal.

Destinations

Fleet

 the Grand Canyon Airlines fleet consists of the following aircraft:

Accidents and incidents
 On June 18, 1986, Grand Canyon Airlines Flight 6, a de Havilland Canada DHC-6-300 (N76GC) of the airline collided with a Bell 206 JetRanger helicopter operated by Helitech Helicopters. Both aircraft were operating scenic air tour flights over the Grand Canyon when the collision occurred near Crystal Rapids. The collision killed all 25 people on both aircraft.
 On September 27, 1989, Grand Canyon Airlines Flight 5, a de Havilland Canada DHC-6-300 (N75GC) of the airline crashed while performing a go-around at Grand Canyon National Park Airport. Both crew members and eight of 19 passengers died.

References

External links

 
Regional Airline Association members
Airlines established in 1927
Companies based in Arizona
Regional airlines of the United States
Airlines based in Arizona
American companies established in 1927
1927 establishments in Arizona